Gösta Caroli (6 November 1902 – 8 May 1975) was a double agent working for MI5 during the Second World War under the codename SUMMER.

Gösta Caroli and Wulf Schmidt (a Danish citizen) landed, via parachute, in September 1940. The two were genuine Nazis, had trained together and were friends. Caroli was coerced into turning double in return for Schmidt's life being spared, whilst Schmidt was told that Caroli had sold him out and in anger swapped sides.

Caroli quickly became a problem; he attempted to strangle his MI5 handler before making an escape carrying a canoe, on a motorcycle. He vaguely planned to row to the Netherlands, but came unstuck after falling off the bike in front of a policeman. He was eventually recaptured and judged too much trouble to be used. Schmidt was more of a success. Codenamed 'Tate', he continued to contact Germany until May 1945.

References

Further reading 
 Tommy Jonason & Simon Olsson, Agent TATE: The Wartime Story of Harry Williamson. London: Amberley Publishing, 2011. .

1902 births
1975 deaths
Double agents
World War II spies for the United Kingdom
Double-Cross System
Abwehr
World War II spies for Germany